Karen McKeown  is an Australian politician who has previously served as the Mayor of the City of Penrith.

Career
McKeown graduated from Western Sydney University with a Bachelor of Commerce degree majoring in management with double sub-majors in Law & Employee Relation. She also holds an Executive Certificate for Elected Members from University of Technology Sydney and a Labour Law certificate from the University of Sydney and she is a graduate of the Australian Institute of Company Directors and the Australian Institute of Superannuation Trustees.

McKeown is Vice President of the Australian Local Government Women's Association NSW, a Councillor on Hawkesbury River County Council, Director of Penrith Performing & Visual Arts, a member of the Penrith CBD Corporation Board, Local Traffic Committee, Chair of Council's Resilience and Multicultural Committees, a Director of Local Government NSW and Australian Local Government Association and Deputy Chair of Active Super.

Politics
McKeown was elected to Penrith City Council in 2004 and served as Deputy Mayor from 2006 to 2007 before serving as Mayor from 2015 to 2016. She is a member of the Australian Labor Party and was announced as the party's endorsed candidate for the New South Wales state seat of Penrith for the 2019 New South Wales state election but was defeated by the incumbent member Stuart Ayres.

McKeown returned to the position of Deputy Mayor in 2019, serving in that capacity until acceding to the position of Mayor in 2020. She was succeeded in that position by Tricia Hitchen in 2022. She was announced as the Labor candidate for the state seat of Penrith at the 2023 election.

Personal life
McKeown has four children and resides in Penrith with her husband Brendan.

References 

Living people
Mayors of Penrith, New South Wales
Year of birth missing (living people)